The lined chub (Hybopsis lineapunctata) is a species of freshwater ray-finned fish from the carp and minnow family, Cyprinidae. It is endemic to the United States of America where it occurs in the Coosa and Tallapoosa River systems in the states of Alabama, Georgia and Tennessee. It can be found in small to medium-sized streams which have pools and riffles over sand, gravel, or rubble beds; especially in gently flowing to quiet, clear water close to riffles and vegetation. It feeds on chironomid larvae and pupae, and larger aquatic insects  It is threatened by canalisation of its native rivers and by siltation caused by logging.

References

https://web.archive.org/web/20130111034246/http://www.bio.utk.edu/hulseylab/Fishlist.html

Hybopsis
Fish described in 1971
Freshwater fish of the United States